The 2005 AFF U-23 Youth Championship was the first ever edition of the AFF U-23 Youth Championship, organised by ASEAN Football Federation. The tournament was held from 29 August to 7 September in Bangkok, Thailand. This tournament was also known as the pre-SEA Games tournament, as a preparatory tournament for the nations competing in the Manila SEA Games in December of the same year.

Venues

Squads 
Philippines squad
Singapore squad

Tournament 
All times are Thailand Standard Time (TST) - UTC+7

Group stage

Group A

Group B

Knockout stage

Bracket

Semi-finals

Third place play-off

Final

Winner

References 
General
Garin, Erik "Pre Sea Games U-23 Tournament (Thailand) 2005" RSSSF.
"AFF U23 Youth Championship 2005" ASEAN Football Federation.

Specific

U-23 Youth Championship, 2005
2005
AFF U-22 Youth Championship
2005 in Thai football
2005 in youth association football